Seed fly may refer to:
 the bean seed fly (Delia platura), a fly species in the family Anthomyiidae
 the ragwort seed fly (Botanophila seneciella), a fly species in the family Anthomyiidae

Insect common names